is a Shinto shrine in Matsuyama, Ehime Prefecture, Japan. Enshrined are Emperor Chūai, Empress Jingū, and Emperor Ōjin. A number of its buildings and treasures have been designated Important Cultural Properties.

History
It is said that the shrine was founded on the site where Emperor Chūai and Empress Jingū bathed at Dōgo Onsen and it is mentioned in Engi shiki. In the fourteenth century the Kōno clan moved the shrine to its present location and it was rebuilt by the Matsudaira clan in the seventeenth century. Isaniwa Jinja was restored in 1970.

Buildings
Isaniwa Jinja is modelled upon Iwashimizu Hachiman-gū in Kyoto Prefecture and constructed in the Hachiman-zukuri style.
 Honden (1667) (Important Cultural Property)
 Mōshidono corridor (1667) (ICP)
 Rōmon (1667) (ICP)
 Kairō (1667) (ICP)
 Massha (ICP)

Treasures
A treasure hall houses a number of swords and suits of armour.
 Tachi (Kamakura period) (ICP)

See also

 Iwashimizu Hachiman-gū

References

External links
  Isaniwa Jinja - English summary
  Isaniwa Jinja homepage

Shinto shrines in Ehime Prefecture
Important Cultural Properties of Japan
Hachiman shrines